Bolton Metropolitan Borough Council elections are generally held three years out of every four, with a third of the council being elected each time. Bolton Metropolitan Borough Council, generally known as Bolton Council, is the local authority for the metropolitan borough of Bolton in Greater Manchester, England. Since the last boundary changes in 2004, 60 councillors have been elected from 20 wards. New ward boundaries are being prepared to take effect from the 2023 election.

Political control
From 1889 to 1974 Bolton was a county borough, independent of any county council. Under the Local Government Act 1972 it had its territory enlarged and became a metropolitan borough, with Greater Manchester County Council providing county-level services. The first election to the reconstituted borough council was held in 1973, initially operating as a shadow authority before coming into its revised powers on 1 April 1974. Greater Manchester County Council was abolished in 1986 and Bolton became a unitary authority. Political control of the council since 1973 has been held by the following parties:

Leadership
The first leader of the metropolitan borough council, John Hanscomb, had been the last leader of the old county borough council (or corporation) of Bolton. The leaders of the council since 1974 have been:

Council elections
Between 1973 and 1980, there were 69 councillors; three seats for each of the 23 wards. Following ward boundary changes for the 1980 election, the number of wards was reduced to 20 and all 60 seats were contested. Further boundary changes were made for the 2004 election and again all council seats were contested.

1973 election
1975 election
1976 election
1978 election
1979 election
1980 election
1982 election
1983 election
1984 election
1986 election
1987 election
1988 election
1990 election
1991 election
1992 election
1994 election
1995 election
1996 election
1998 election
1999 election
2000 election
2002 election
2003 election
2004 election
2006 election
2007 election
2008 election
2010 election
2011 election
2012 election
2014 election
2015 election
2016 election
2018 election
2019 election
2021 election

By-election results

References

External links
 Bolton Council
 Local Authority By-election Results 

 
Election
Elections in the Metropolitan Borough of Bolton
Council elections in Greater Manchester
Metropolitan borough council elections in England